GO ALRT (Government of Ontario Advanced Light Rail Transit) was a rapid transit system proposed by GO Transit in 1982. The ALRT system would have been implemented along two new lines in the Greater Toronto Area. It would have used a new electric train to provide interurban service, also then referred to as "inter-regional rapid transit", along the existing and new GO corridors. The system was based on an enlarged UTDC ICTS vehicle that was designed to offer a compromise between passenger capacity and the level of infrastructure needed to support it. The project was cancelled due to budget cuts of the Tory government in 1985, although a number of the proposed lines were later implemented using conventional heavy rail systems, including the eastern portion of the Lakeshore East GO train service route from Pickering station, to Whitby station, in Durham region.

Fleet 

A number of vehicle design concepts were considered during the life of the GO ALRT Project, with an initial design similar to the Mark 1 ICTS vehicle, with later modifications making the vehicle larger and longer. Such a vehicle would have been designed and built by UTDC, although the crown corporation was sold off to Lavalin Inc in 1986, becoming known as UTDC Inc, before being sold to Bombardier in 1992.

Cars 

The proposed line would have used a modified version of the Urban Transportation Development Corporation's ICTS car, which would undergo about two additional railcar vehicle redesigns over the course of the program's iteration. This proposed ALRT car was a two-car articulated vehicle, as opposed to individual cars with articulated bogies. The original vehicle design consisted of a unit of three married articulated ICTS cars forming a single train. As time progressed, however, the dimensions of the cars increased, mainly in length, until they reached the same length as a regular passenger rail coach. Also, the GO-ALRT cars were to have used an overhead catenary for power pickup instead of an alternating current third rail, and conventional traction motors were to have been used instead of a linear induction motor. The decision to launch the program was made after a study was published examining several options including the use of electric multiple units, standard diesel trains, electric trains, and ALRT.

 Design 1: 124 passengers - 36.0 m articulated car set
 Design 2: 147 passengers - 45.6 m articulated car set

Stations 

List of the planned stations on the ALRT routes (stations listed west to east):

Cancellation 

The GO-ALRT program died at the hand of the Peterson government in 1985, but there are other factors that were considered:

 Unproven technology and concerns over problems with the same ICTS on the Scarborough RT
 Access to right-of-way on the southern route

Since the cancellation, there has been no similar plans for GO in Toronto. GO Transit does operate bus service along Highway 401 that parallels the northern ALRT route. Expansion of the Lakeshore line also provides similar servicing offered in the southern ALRT route.

As for ICTS technology, it was acquired by Bombardier Transportation when it acquired UTDC and is now showcased in the Bombardier Advanced Rapid Transit platform, or as the transit vehicle technology is referred to as now as the Bombardier Innovia Metro 300, as part of a grouped transit vehicle technology lineup of the Bombardier Innovia product line.

Reflection 

The GO ALRT project was an idea that was ahead of its time. As there had been inter-regional inter-urban rail service provided earlier in the 20th century, obviously the loss of the inter-urbans, or radial cars as is referred to in Canada, to expressways and urban renewal was a decision that was short sighted at best. Coming to more recent times there is more of an emphasis of attempting to revitalize as well as reconceptualizing the suburbs as having urban infill development, similar to the store fronts with apartments on top as seen in downtown Toronto throughfares, with light rail transit similar to European low floor tramways providing a transportation linkage for such a newer concept of built space. Providing a long distance high speed rail rapid transit connection would be similar to the Bay Area Rapid Transit or the Hong Kong MTR, although as of late there is little discussion of linking the suburbs with a BART like system.

The spiritual successor to GO-ALRT is the GO Transit Regional Express Rail project. The project is expected to electrify and increase frequencies on existing GO train lines to every 3-8 minutes during peak-times and every 6-15 minutes off-peak on five of the corridors. The project once complete will be similar to other European regional rail networks such as the Réseau Express Régional in Paris. Operating at metro-like frequencies throughout the Greater Toronto Area.

References

External links 
 The GO ALRT Program

Rapid transit in Canada
GO Transit